Alfred Edwin Brain Jr. (born London, 24 October 1885; died Los Angeles, 29 March 1966) was an English player of the French horn.  He came from a family which included many famous horn players, including his nephew, Dennis Brain.

His father, Alfred Edwin Brain Sr. was a well-known horn player.  Alfred started to learn the trumpet when he was six, but when he was twelve he changed to the French horn and learned from his father.  He studied at the Royal Academy of Music with Adolf Borsdorf and also learned the piano from G.D.Cunningham who was to teach his nephew the organ forty years later.  His first professional job was with the Scottish Orchestra.  He then played in the Queen’s Hall Orchestra and the London Symphony Orchestra.

When World War I broke out he joined the Scots Guards. Later, in 1917, he did a lot of dangerous work in France where the fighting was taking place.  After the war he was awarded the British War Medal and Victory Medal for his bravery.

When he returned after the war he worked with several of the London orchestras, including Covent Garden where he played for Sir Thomas Beecham.  His brother Aubrey, also an excellent horn player, returned from the war after him.  By this time Alfred had got all the best horn jobs in London, so it was difficult for Aubrey to find jobs.

In 1923 he emigrated to the United States.  He played in the New York Philharmonic Orchestra and later for the Los Angeles Philharmonic Orchestra.  In his later years he recorded a lot in movie studios, including for 20th century Fox.

References
 Oxford Music Online retrieved 21.11.2010
 Pettitt, Stephen. Dennis Brain: A Biography. London: Robert Hale, 1976.

External links
 

1885 births
1966 deaths
Classical horn players
Musicians from London
Horn players
American horn players
English emigrants to the United States
20th-century classical musicians